Chöje Lama Gelongma Palmo, (wylie: chos rje bla ma dge slong ma dpal mo ཆོས་རྗེ་བླ་མ་དགེ་སློང་མ་དཔལ་མོ།); * 1970 Sabine Januschke in Vienna is one of the few female Lamas of Buddhism and the first ever non Asian, female Chöje Lama.

Lama Palmo is well known for explaining the dharma in an accessible and contemporary way. Besides her spiritual and social responsibilities, she is actively involved in many fields and is known for possessing a wide range of practical and intellectual skills, as well as being deeply sincere in her compassionate Buddhist activities. She has for instance established an animal sanctuary, and is very accomplished at both Western and Tibetan Buddhist arts.

Chöje Lama Palmo  was sent to Austria by her lineage and its Supreme Head H. H. The Chamgon Kenting Tai Situpa in 2004 to teach the dharma. She established Palpung Europe with its institutes in Purkersdorf near Vienna and Langschlag in the Waldviertel, The European Seat of the Chamgon Kenting Tai Situpa and the Palpung lineage with its seat in exile in Northern India. She is Palpung Europe's Head Lama.

Life

Born 1970 in Vienna, Lama Palmo graduated with Vienna Business School, studied German Philology and Romance languages at University of Vienna and received a Master of the Arts degree in German Medievalism. As a media expert she worked as journalist, in the public relation fields and as photographer until her monastic ordination.

Since her first contact with Buddhism in her early twenties, she studied under the Palpung Sherab Ling Monastic Seat in India and received her entire training in her monastery. In 1998, she received her first monastic vows and entered the traditional Kagyu: three-years-retreat in KTD and USA, then being sent to Japan after its completion in 2004. In the same year, she was sent back to Austria. In December 2004, she received a Gelongma (tib.: dge slong ma, དགེ་སློང་མ།) full monastic Bhikkhuni ordination from a Mahayana lineage.

In 2006 she met the Dalai Lama and Gyalwa Karmapa Orgyen Trinley Dorje in private audiences. Both gave their advice and blessing for Lama Palmo's projects. In 2007, she was appointed director and resident teacher of Palpung Yeshe Chökhor Ling Europe by Tai Situ Rinpoche.

September 22, 2013 she was appointed Chöje Lama by Tai Situ Rinpoche. November 5, 2014, she received the Traditional Tibetan Appointment Document from H. H. 12th Chamgon Kenting Tai Situpa.

Activities
She established, guides and directs Palpung Europe, the European Seat of the Palpung lineage of Tibetan Buddhism with institutes in Purkersdorf near Vienna and Langschlag in the Waldviertel.  Palpung Europe are Buddhist institutes and practice communities of the Palpung lineage of Vajrayana. Chöje Lama Palmo is actively involved into interreligious dialogue and is both guest and host of interreligious events of different formats with representatives of various religions. Chöje Lama Palmo is involved in the interreligious exchange for a better getting to know and acceptance of religions and their teachings for more harmony and peace in the world. In her social service, she is engaged within her Palpung Europe Welfare project,  having created an animal sanctuary. She is further pastoring inmates and is punctually involved in other projects for the welfare of others. Further, she established Palpung Europe Publications in order to preserve and provide students with the Palpung lineage in transmissions, teachings and practice material in German language.

Publications
 Gelongma Lama Palmo Shangrila meines Herzens - mein Weg zur buddhistischen Priesterin, Rütten & Loening, 2012, 
 Gelongma Lama Palmo The Himalayas and Beyond - Karma Kagyu Buddhism in India and Nepal, Foreword by the Dalai Lama, Palpung Yeshe Chökhor Ling Europe, 2009, 
 Online teachings

References

External links
 Chöje Lama Palmo's biography
 Chöje Lama Palmo's activities
 Chöje Lama Palmo in the media (selection)
 ORF: Buddha bevorzugt! – Porträt einer österreichischen Nonne
 Chöje Lama Palmo's books
 Palpung Europe in the ÖBR, Austrian Buddhist Union

Karma Kagyu lamas
Vajrayana and women
Tibetan Buddhist nuns
Religious pluralism
Austrian Buddhists
1970 births
Living people
20th-century Buddhist nuns
21st-century Buddhist nuns